Scopula limbata is a moth of the family Geometridae. It was described by Wileman in 1915. It is found in Taiwan and Japan.

References

Moths described in 1915
limbata
Moths of Japan
Moths of Taiwan